Captain's Gig (foaled 1965 in Kentucky) was an American Thoroughbred racehorse.

Background
Captain's Gig was bred and raced by Harry Guggenheim's Cain Hoy Stable. Sired by Turn-To, his dam was Guggenheim's good runner Make Sail who in 1960 won the Kentucky Oaks and Alabama Stakes. Damsire Ambiorix was the Leading sire in North America in 1961 and the Leading broodmare sire in Great Britain & Ireland in 1963. He was trained by Bill Stephens,

Racing career
Captain's Gig won three of five starts at age two in 1967. His wins that year included the most prestigious race for American juveniles, the Futurity Stakes at Aqueduct in which he set a new track record. As a three-year-old en route to the first leg of the 1968 U.S. Triple Crown series, the lightly raced colt won an Allowance race followed by a 3½ length win in the Forerunner Purse at Keeneland. He then ran away from the field in capturing the Stepping Stone Purse by eight lengths at Churchill Downs. Sent off as the fourth choice by bettors in the Kentucky Derby, Captain's Gig finished tenth. The colt went on to run second in both the Jersey Derby and the Jerome Handicap 
but won the Jim Dandy Stakes at Saratoga Race Course.

Stud record
Captain's Gig was retired to stud for the 1970 season. He stood in the United States in 1970 and 1971 then was sent to breeders in Ireland in time for the 1972 season. He was not a very successful at stud, but did sire Manado, the leading European two-year-old of 1975.

References

1965 racehorse births
Racehorses bred in Kentucky
Racehorses trained in the United States
Horse racing track record setters
Thoroughbred family 7-c